Karen B. Johnson (May 12, 1942 – June 10, 2019) was an American politician and activist who served as the Mayor of Schenectady, New York, from 1983 to 1991. Johnson became the first woman to be elected to the Schenectady City Council in 1975 and the first female Mayor of Schenectady in 1983. She remains the first and only woman ever to serve as Schenectady's mayor in history.

References

1942 births
2019 deaths
Mayors of Schenectady, New York
Women in New York (state) politics
Women mayors of places in New York (state)
County legislators in New York (state)
New York (state) Democrats
Radcliffe College alumni
Rensselaer Polytechnic Institute alumni
21st-century American women